A cavalier was a supporter of the Royalist cause during the Wars of the Three Kingdoms.

Cavalier may also refer to:

 Cavalier poets of the English Civil War Poet
 Cavalier Parliament (1661–1679), Restoration Parliament
 Cavalryman
 Paladin, in some contexts
 Knight
 Virginia Cavaliers (historical)
 Cavalier (playing card)

Corporations
 Cavalier Telephone and TV  a, U.S. internet and telephone company
 Cavalier Records, a defunct American record label
 Cavalier Chocolate, a Belgian chocolatier making only chocolate products without adding sugar

Dance
 Cavalier, principal male role in The Nutcracker ballet
 A cavalier, or kavalyé, is one of the dancers in the Dominican folk dance bélé

People
Cavalier Johnson, American politician 
Dorothy Cavalier Yanik (1928–2015), American visual artist and educator
René-Robert Cavelier, Sieur de La Salle (1643–1687), French explorer best known as "La Salle"
  J.M.A. Cavelier de Cuverville (1834–1912),  a vice admiral of the French Navy after whom Cuverville Island is named
 Alain Cavalier (born 1931), French film director
 Marie Cavallier (born 1976), second wife of Prince Joachim of Denmark
 Nita Cavalier (1906–1969), American silent film and stage actress

Places
 Cavalier, North Dakota, a city
 Cavalier County, North Dakota, a county
 Cavalier Air Force Station, a United States Air Force installation in North Dakota
 Cavalier Tower, a tower in Qrendi, Malta

Publications
 Cavalier (comics), a DC Comics supervillain, a minor enemy of Batman
 Cavalier (magazine), a Fawcett Publications men's magazine
 Cavalier (Nedor Comics), a Nedor Comics superhero from the Golden Age of Comics
 Cavalier (Dungeons & Dragons), a warrior designation available to players of Dungeons & Dragons
 Cavaliers and Roundheads, a set of rules for English Civil War miniature wargaming
 The Cavalier, an American pulp magazine later merged with The All-Story

Sports teams
 Cleveland Cavaliers, a professional basketball team in the United States
 Virginia Cavaliers, any of the University of Virginia's athletic teams
 Virginia–Wise Cavaliers, any athletic teams of the University of Virginia's College at Wise
 New Zealand Cavaliers, the unofficial New Zealand rugby team which toured South Africa in 1986
 The Cavaliers Drum and Bugle Corps, a modern drum and bugle corps from Rosemont, Illinois
 Cavalier F.C., Jamaican football team
 Cavalier FC, Bahamian football team

Transportation
 The Cavalier flying boat, lost in 1939
 Cavalier Mustang, a civilian-modified version of the North American P-51 Mustang aircraft
 The Cavalier range of yachts produced by Cavalier Yachts in New Zealand
 Chevrolet Cavalier, automobile in the US
 Packard Cavalier, a luxury automobile made in the US
 Vauxhall Cavalier, automobile in the UK
 AMC Cavalier, a symmetrical show car with interchangeable body panels
 Mk VII Cavalier tank, a British cruiser tank during World War II
 Cavalier (N&W train), operated by the Norfolk and Western Railway between Chicago and Norfolk
 Cavalier (Canadian train), operated by Canadian National Railway and Via Rail Canada between Montreal and Toronto
 Cavalier (PRR train), operated by the Pennsylvania Railroad between New York and Cape Charles, Virginia
MacFam Cavalier, a homebuilt aircraft design
Cavalier, the aircraft of the 1939 Imperial Airways flying boat ditching

Other
 Cavalier (fortification)
 Cavalier (grape), another name for the white French wine grape Len de l'El
 Cavalier King Charles Spaniel, a breed of small toy dog
 Cavalier perspective, an oblique projection (a way to represent a three-dimensional object on a flat drawing)
 Hilltop Manor (The Cavalier Apartment Building), historic building in Washington, D.C.
 J. Frank Wilson and the Cavaliers, a rock group
 The Cavalier (film), a 1928 western
 Cavalier (album), a 2007 album by Tom Brosseau